Harold White (1 September 1896 – 12 September 1977) was a New Zealand cricketer. He played in one first-class match for Wellington in 1923/24.

See also
 List of Wellington representative cricketers

References

External links
 

1896 births
1977 deaths
New Zealand cricketers
Wellington cricketers
Cricketers from Melbourne
People from Brunswick, Victoria